Thomas Mylling (or Milling) was a medieval Bishop of Hereford. He was Abbot of Westminster from 1469 to 1474. He was nominated as bishop on 22 June 1474 and consecrated on 21 August 1474. He died on about 12 January 1492.

It was most unusual at the time for an abbot to be made a bishop, and the promotion is a mark of the regard in which Mylling was held by King Edward IV. He had earned the King's special gratitude during the Readeption of Henry VI, when Mylling, then Abbot of Westminster, gave sanctuary to Queen Elizabeth Woodville and her daughters in the Abbey, showed them  every  kindness, and presided at the birth of the King's eldest son, to whom he stood as godfather.

Citations

References

 

Bishops of Hereford
1492 deaths
15th-century English Roman Catholic bishops
Year of birth unknown